The 1951 Davis Cup was the 40th edition of the most important tournament between national teams in men's tennis. 21 teams entered the Europe Zone, and 5 teams entered the America Zone. The Europe Zone began using a seeding system, where the previous year's quarterfinalists were guaranteed a bye in the first round.

The United States defeated Canada in the America Zone final, and Sweden defeated West Germany in the Europe Zone final. The USA defeated Sweden in the Inter-Zonal play-off, but fell to defending champions Australia in the Challenge Round. The final was played at White City Stadium in Sydney, Australia on 26–28 December.

America Zone

Draw

Final
Canada vs. United States

Europe Zone

Draw

Final
Sweden vs. West Germany

Inter-Zonal Final
United States vs. Sweden

Challenge Round
Australia vs. United States

References

External links
Davis Cup official website

 
Davis Cups by year
Davis Cup
Davis Cup
Davis Cup
Davis Cup